Mikhail Babaev (born Moscow, 19 January 1986) is a Russian rugby union player. He plays as a wing and as a centre.

Babaev plays for VVA-Podmoskovye Monino, known as VVA Saracens, since 2003, in Russia.

He has 57 caps for Russia, since 2006, with 4 tries, 20 points on aggregate. He was called for the 2011 Rugby World Cup, playing in two games and remaining scoreless. He has been a regular player for the Russia team in the recent years, having played for the 2015 Rugby World Cup qualifyings, lost in repechage to Uruguay.

References

External links
Mikhail Babaev International Statistics

1986 births
Living people
Russia international rugby union players
Russian rugby union players
Rugby union centres
Rugby union wings
VVA Podmoskovye players